The Koenigsegg TFG is an Inline-3 engine. The TFG stands for "Tiny Friendly Giant." It is a Freevalve (Camless piston engine), thus it does not have a camshaft. Instead it uses pneumatic actuators that allows it to open each valve (both intake and exhaust) independently to maximise performance and minimise fuel consumption depending on driving conditions. The pneumatic actuators also have the ability to switch the engine between 2-stroke cycles and 4-stroke cycles by controlling the number of power strokes in relation to the number of idle strokes. The patent for this system was bought by Koenigsegg's sister company Cargine Engineering in 2002. The Variable displacement system allows fuel economy to be 15%-20% higher than a variable camshaft engine. Cold start emissions are also drastically reduced by 60% over a variable camshaft engine. The engine is equipped with a small turbo for one set of exhaust valves, and a larger turbo for the other set of exhaust valves. However this Twin-turbo is neither a Sequential nor a Staged system. The engine can operate on the Otto cycle, Miller cycle or the Atkinson cycle. Further advantages of the camless engine is that a Throttle body is no longer required because of the precision of the valve timing. According to Koenigsegg CEO, Christian von Koenigsegg, when running on Gen 2.0 ethanol, the TFG becomes "at least as CO2-neutral as an EV running on renewable electric sources such as solar or wind." The TFG follows previous Koenigsegg engines in its ability to run on all major fuels, from E100 to standard gas.

References 

Straight-three engines
Koenigsegg vehicles